This is a list of all the yachts built by Amels, sorted by year.

Amels BV

1974–1999

2000–2009

2010–2019

2020–present

Under construction

Damen Yachts

2020–present

Under construction

Superyacht support vessel

1996–2009

2010–2019

2020–present

Under construction

See also
 List of motor yachts by length
 List of yacht support vessels by length
 Luxury yacht
 Amels Holland B.V.

References

Damen Yachting
Built by Amels BV
Damen Yachting